The Land of Oz is a fictional country first introduced in L. Frank Baum's novel based on The Wonderful Wizard of Oz.

Land of Oz or The Land of Oz may also refer to:

 A Biblical land, which location today is not known certainly.
The Land of Oz (book), L. Frank Baum's sequel to The Wonderful Wizard of Oz
The Land of Oz (film), 2015 Russian film
Land of Oz (theme park), an amusement park located in Beech Mountain, North Carolina, USA
Australia, which is sometimes called simply Oz.

See also
The Marvelous Land of Oz (comics), comic book series based The Land of Oz book